COBRA is a British political thriller-drama television series on Sky One that premiered in January 2020. The six-episode first series is written by Ben Richards and stars Robert Carlyle and Victoria Hamilton.

The series premiered on PBS in the United States on 4 October 2020. In February 2020, it was renewed for a second series titled Cyberwar, which was broadcast in the UK in late 2021 and then on PBS in the US early on streaming in February 2022 and then officially premiered on July 10, 2022. A third installment, titled Rebellion, was confirmed in May 2022 and is expected to air in 2023.

The title of the series refers to Cabinet Office Briefing Room A, the location in Whitehall where British Prime Ministers often hold important emergency meetings.

Plot

Series 1 
A massive solar flare strikes Europe, blowing the electric grid and navigational systems, leaving much of Britain without power and creating social and political chaos. As a result, Prime Minister Robert Sutherland must decide how and where to distribute a limited number of relief generators to provide power. Meanwhile, his daughter Ellie's best friend dies after consuming cocaine and fentanyl Ellie provided.  In order to avoid scandal and potentially prison, Ellie is encouraged to lie by Press Secretary Peter Mott and her mother, Rachel Sutherland, to say the dead friend brought the drugs.

The outage continues in Northumberland, leading to a vigilante force blockading access to the region, hijacking trucks of fuel and water, and calling for an overthrow of the government. Anna Marshall, Sutherland's Chief of Staff, is unexpectedly visited by an old flame from her days as a war correspondent and finds the passion still exists.  Upon finding that he could be associated with a Bosnian mobster, Marshall confides her liaison to Eleanor James, Head of the Joint Intelligence Committee, whose loyalties lie more with the Home Secretary than with the Prime Minister. Meanwhile, Home Secretary Archie Glover-Morgan works to unseat Sutherland by exploiting every possible angle, including the death of Ellie's friend and Marshall's indiscretion, to embarrass and discredit him.

Sutherland uses the British Army to break the Northumberland blockade by any means necessary, including the controversial decision to authorise deadly force, and a young photojournalist is killed. Condemning the handling of the crisis, Glover-Morgan orchestrates a vote of no confidence, then tries to bribe Sutherland into manoeuvring staff into his favour in return for his support during the vote. But after delivering on a promise and successfully restoring power to a beleaguered hospital, series 1 ends with Sutherland calling for a general election, confident he will win.

Series 2: Cyberwar 
An explosion on a sunken World War II ammunition ship devastates the north Kent coastline, causing hundreds of deaths including that of the area's local MP. Rescue attempts are blocked by a cyber attack that brings mobile communications down, which the government believes may have been orchestrated by Russia in retaliation for Britain's arrest of two people believed to be responsible for the killing of a Ukrainian oligarch that also killed a local rugby coach. As more cyber attacks continue, targeting Border Security at Dover and the Kent water supply, Sutherland and his government (with a narrow majority of nine votes) must find out who is responsible whilst dealing with chaos and panic in the streets. Sutherland must also deal with political threats from both a reinvigorated Labour Party and Glover-Morgan, whom he reluctantly returns the whip to in order to bolster the Tory majority.

Cast and characters

Main
Robert Carlyle as Robert Sutherland, the Prime Minister and Leader of the Conservative Party
Victoria Hamilton as Anna Marshall, the Downing Street Chief of Staff and a former war correspondent
David Haig as Archie Glover-Morgan, a Conservative politician and the Home Secretary. He is reluctantly appointed Foreign Secretary by Sutherland in series 2.
Richard Dormer as Fraser Walker, the Director of the Civil Contingencies Secretariat
Lucy Cohu as Rachel Sutherland, a lawyer and wife of Robert Sutherland
Edward Bennett as Peter Mott, an adviser who served as the Downing Street Press Secretary
Marsha Thomason as Francine Bridge, a former Labour Party MP who briefly worked for Sutherland
Lisa Palfrey as Eleanor James, Head of the Joint Intelligence Committee

Recurring

Series 1
Marisa Abela as Ellie Sutherland, the daughter of Robert and Rachel
Steven Cree as Stuart Collier, the Chief Constable of Tyneside Police
Angus Wright as General Rodney Pickering, Chief of Defence Staff
Ellie Kendrick as  Stephanie Lodge, a Civil Contingencies Secretariat officer
Emmanuel Imani as James Odubajo, a Civil Contingencies Secretariat officer
 Charlie Carrick as Scott Minett, a former soldier and leader of the People's Justice Movement
Con O'Neill as Harry Rowntree, the communist leader of the Lorry Drivers Union
Alexandre Willaume as Edin Tosumbegovic, a Bosnian War survivor, hitman for a Serbian mobster and Marshall's lover

Series 2
 Richard Pepple as Joseph Obasi, the new Home Secretary and Glover-Morgan's successor 
 Alexa Davies as Audrey Hemmings, a Civil Contingencies Secretariat officer
 Karan Gill as Hari Misra, an investigative journalist and podcaster for the website Morbid Symptoms
 Andrew Buchan as Chris Edwards, the Leader of the Labour Party and Leader of the Opposition

Production 
In May 2022, it was confirmed Sky had ordered a six-part third installment of COBRA titled COBRA: Rebellion. Toby Finlay would be lead writer, joined by James Wood and Rachel Anthony in the writers' room.

In November 2022, it was announced Jane Horrocks had joined the cast of COBRA for its third series as Defence Secretary Victoria Dalton.

The series has been filmed in Merseyside Yorkshire and London. Scenes set in Kent (implied within the programme to be Sheerness) in Series 2 were filmed in New Brighton, Wirral and Fleetwood, Lancashire. Principal photography for the third series was underway as of October 2022 in the Cheshire village of Lower Peover. Crew were reported in Halewood in January 2023. London's Cenotaph was recreated in Liverpool City Centre later that month.

Episodes

Series 1 (2020)
Based on true events.

Series 2 (2021)

Critical reception 
The Telegraph gave the first episode 3/5 stars and called it a gripping thriller, yet "implausible and clichéd". The Independent gave the series 2/5 stars, calling it a "(C)heap-looking series (which) creaks and clunks along", and the best parts are the breaks for commercials. Australia's TV Tonight said it "can’t quite settle on whether it's a political thriller or a disaster mini-series. I’m reminded of Irwin Allen films, or even National Geographic’s American Blackout, with more satisfying results."

See also
 Cabinet Office Briefing Rooms, abbr. COBR, nicknamed Cobra
 List of fictional prime ministers of the United Kingdom

References

External links 
 

2020 British television series debuts
2020s British drama television series
Sky UK original programming
British action television series
Television series by All3Media
English-language television shows
Television shows set in London
Television shows set in Kent
Works about the Serbian Mafia